The Devil Has My Double is the debut album released on June 1, 2008, by American-born singer Jane Badler. On the album she collaborates with the Melbourne band Sir.

Track listing
 "When We Got High" - 5:04
 "Who Did You Wear That Dress For" - 3:17
 "I Love Everything" - 5:43
 "The Devil Has My Double" - 3:21
 "Everybody Know My Secrets" - 6:27
 "I Never Throw Anything Away" - 3:53
 "Single Tonight" - 4:22
 "A Dream Only Lasts" - 3:24
 "Tears Are Made of Water" - 3:01
 "The Doll That Cries Real Tears" - 3:56
 "True Love Is a Bore" - 3:59

Sources
 http://www.uar.com.au/uar/releases/uar059.htm

2008 albums